Maria  Nalbandian (born August 1, 1985), also known as Maria, is a Lebanese Armenian pop star from Beirut, Lebanon.

Biography 
Nalbandian was born to Armenian parents. She studied Business Marketing and is currently pursuing a singing career mainly in her native (Armenian) language. Since Maria was discovered at age 13, she has done many commercials. She won the Miss Bikini Asia 2002 in Malta aged 17. She speaks three languages: Armenian, Arabic, and English. Her music videos include "Elaab" where she sucks on lollipops and bathes in chocolate cornflakes in milk, and "Bahebbak Add Eih" where she plays the role of a girl in love, to date all directed by Jad Shwery. In 2004 she won the best showbiz star in the Arab world. In 2008, she starred in the movies Bedoon Raqaba, and Ahasees. In 2012, she became the ambassador of Fem USA Hair Removal. In 2013, she started singing in Armenian in her native language and did many music videos such as "Djane Djan" and "De Kena". In 2015 with her manager Hovig Mouradian she made her first Armenian album "Mi Eraz" (A Dream) and she won Top Beautiful Armenian Woman World Wide and Best Showbiz Star 2015.

Discography

Albums
Elaab (2005)

We Regeat Tany (2007)

Mi Eraz (2015)

Other Songs

Videography

Music Videos

Filmography

Television Programs

Commercials

Beauty Contests

References

External links
 
 

1985 births
Living people
Lebanese people of Armenian descent
21st-century Lebanese women singers
21st-century Armenian women singers
Lebanese film actresses
Armenian film actresses
Armenian television actresses
Musicians from Beirut
Singers who perform in Egyptian Arabic